Nekemias arborea,  commonly known as pepper vine, is native to the Southeastern United States, Texas, and New Mexico. It spreads rapidly, climbing up trees and bushes. It prefers moist soils such as stream banks, and disturbed areas.

Description 

 A deciduous to semi-evergreen vine that can be ground cover-like, but is often high-climbing and bushy. Grows 35 ft. or more.

 Leaves are alternate, bi-pinnately divided and up to 6 inches long and wide. There are 1-3 pairs of leaflets. They are roughly ovate and coarsely toothed, dark green on the upper surface, lighter on the lower. Newly emerged leaves are purple-red and change to a light green to dark green as they reach mature size. Foliage turns pale yellow or red in fall. 

 Flat-topped clusters of tiny, green flowers are followed by clusters of pea-sized, bluish-purple berries. Fruit fleshy, up to 5/8 inch in diameter, black and shiny when ripe. Fruit attractive to wildlife but possibly poisonous for humans.

Synonyms
Its synonyms include: Ampelopsis arborea (L.) Koehne, Ampelopsis bipinnata Michx., Ampelopsis pinnata DC.,  Cissus arborea (L.) Des Moul., Cissus bipinnata Elliott, Cissus orientalis Lam., Cissus stans Pers., Hedera arborea (L.) Walter, Nekemias bipinnata Raf., Vitis arborea L., Vitis bipinnata Torr. & A.Gray, and Vitis orientalis (Lam.) Boiss.

Cultivation
Nekemias arborea is used as an ornamental plant in gardens.

References

External links
 Atlas of Florida Plants: Nekemias arborea

Vitaceae
Flora of the Southeastern United States
Flora of Alabama
Flora of New Mexico
Flora of Texas
Garden plants of North America
Plants described in 1753
Taxa named by Carl Linnaeus
Flora without expected TNC conservation status